Charles Melvin Barber (December 27, 1876 – June 23, 1954) was an American football coach, author, botanist and zoologist. He attended the New Mexico College of Agriculture and Mechanic Arts–now known as New Mexico State University–beginning in 1897. He served as the school's head football coach during the 1897 and 1898 seasons, compiling a record of 3–1–1.

Barber traveled extensively across the southwest United States, Mexico, and Central America, collecting animal specimens for American museums. He worked at the Field Museum in Chicago, Illinois from 1903 to 1908.

Head coaching record

References

External links
 

1876 births
1954 deaths
American botanists
American zoologists
New Mexico State Aggies football coaches
New Mexico State University alumni
People from La Porte, Indiana
Players of American football from Indiana